Le Bureau is a 2006 French television show written and directed by Nicolas & Bruno. It is a French adaptation of the popular British television series The Office. Le Bureau adapted the scripts of the original British series, changing character names and many cultural references.

Cast
François Berléand: Gilles Triquet, Regional Director of the Cogirep Villepinte branch. He is based on David Brent.
Xavier Robic: Félix Pradier, trainee.
Benoît Carré: Joel Liotard, Assistant to the Regional Director.
Jérémie Elkaïm: Paul Delorme, Sales Representative.
Alka-Laure Balbir: Laetitia Kadiri, Receptionist.
Frédéric Merlo: Daniel Gabarda, Chief Accountant.
Jean-Pierre Loustau: Didier Leguélec, Representative.
Astrid Bas: Juliette Lebrac, Manager of Cogirep France.
Solène Bouton: Jennifer Langlois.
Jacques-Yves Dorges as Giraud Bernard, Sales Representative.

Summary
It takes place in Villepinte, a business park in the northeast suburbs of Paris.

The series stars François Berléand as Gilles Triquet, France's version of David Brent. Another notable actor, Jérémie Elkaïm of Presque rien fame, also stars in the series playing the French version of Tim Canterbury.

Filming with the French cast was completed in early February; the series began airing on 25 May 2006.

It is the first foreign-language remake of the show, although the German series Stromberg used The Office as a basis for its show format. A dubbed version of the first UK series that ran on cable in France in 2004 fared poorly.

Season schedule

Home release
The DVD was released on 28 August 2006.

See also
 The Office
 List of French adaptations of television series from other countries

References

External links
 
 Canal Plus - Le Bureau
 Pravda - 'The Office' becomes 'Le Bureau'
 Guardian Unlimited - From Slough to Villepinte: it's Le Bureau
 Guardian Unlimited - 'Vulgar, bigoted, cynical': France warms to Le Bureau
 Cogirep
 FT.com Je vous presente... le David Brent francais
 Times Online - The Office, version française

The Office
French television sitcoms
Mockumentary television series
Television shows set in France
French television series based on British television series
2000s French comedy television series
2006 French television series debuts
2006 French television series endings
Television shows set in Paris
Canal+ original programming